Nicole Alexandra Baxter (born May 12, 1994) is an American professional soccer player who plays as a midfielder.

Early life
Raised in Pennington, New Jersey, Baxter played prep soccer at The Pennington School.

Club career

Sky Blue FC
Baxter made her NWSL debut in the 2020 NWSL Challenge Cup on July 4, 2020.

References

External links
 William and Mary profile
 Sky Blue FC profile

1994 births
Living people
American women's soccer players
Soccer players from New Jersey
Sportspeople from Mercer County, New Jersey
The Pennington School alumni
People from Pennington, New Jersey
Women's association football midfielders
William & Mary Tribe women's soccer players
NJ/NY Gotham FC players
American expatriate women's soccer players
Expatriate women's footballers in Sweden
American expatriate sportspeople in Sweden
National Women's Soccer League players